Butz is a surname. Notable people with the surname include:

Albert Butz (1849–1905) was a Swiss-born American inventor and businessman
Arthur Butz (born 1933), American professor and Holocaust denier
Caspar Butz (1825–1885), German American journalist and politician
Dave Butz (1950–2022), American football player
Donald J. Butz (born 1933), U. S. Air Force major-general
Earl Butz (1909–2008), American Secretary of Agriculture under Presidents Nixon and Ford
Edwin Butz (1864–1956), Seventh-day Adventist missionary active in Oceania and Australia
Frank Butz or Frank Dundr (born 1957), German rower
Jeffrey Bütz, American writer
Laura Chenoweth Butz (1860–1939), American educator
Norbert Leo Butz (born 1967), American actor
Steve Butz (born 1959), American politician

See also
Charles W. Buttz (1837–1913), American politician
Buts, surname
Butts (surname)
Betz (disambiguation)
Larry Butz, a fictional character in the Ace Attorney series
Bartz Klauser, a Final Fantasy V character whose name was rendered "Butz" in some versions